Ice Hockey is currently played by approximately 161 high school varsity teams in NJ. Teams are divided into conferences: the Gordon Conference, Big North Conference, New Jersey Ice Hockey League, Morris County Secondary School Ice Hockey League, Union County Ice Hockey League, Skylands Conference, Greater Middlesex Conference, Colonial Valley Conference, Shore Conference, Independents, and Prep Schools.  Most of these leagues are divided into divisions. A State Championship Tournament is organized at the end of the season by the New Jersey State Interscholastic Athletic Association.

Divisions
Hockey is one of the few sports in the state with "rolling divisions". The divisions can change every year depending on the performance of the teams and new teams formed. The divisions are arranged by geography and skill level. Typically, the last place team in a higher division will be moved into the lower division, with the first place team of the lower division moving into the higher division.

Gordon Conference
American Division
National Division

Big North Conference
division
Freedom Division
Liberty Stripes Division
Liberty Stars Division

New Jersey Ice Hockey League
American Division
Liberty Division

Morris County Secondary School Ice Hockey League
Mennen Division
Halvorsen Division
Haas Division
Charette Division

Union County Ice Hockey League
(no divisions)

Skyland Conference
(no divisions)

Greater Middlesex Conference
(no divisions)

Colonial Valley Conference 
Colonial Division
Valley Division

Shore Conference
Shore A North
Shore A Central
Shore A South
Shore B North

Independents
(no divisions)

Independence League (prep)
(no divisions)

source.

State Tournament
The NJSIAA crowns state champions in four categories; Private, Public A, Public B and Public C. Through 1994, public and private schools played in one state tournament; however, private schools dominated the tournament due to their ability to recruit the best players in the state without geographical limitation.  Beginning in 1995, the NJSIAA held separate private and public tournaments, crowning a private and public champion, with these champions playing each other for the overall state championship.  In 2005, the NJSIAA eliminated the overall state championship game because a public school had won only once, in 1997.  Similarly, in 2008, the Public Tournament was divided into A and B categories based on school enrollment as the smaller schools generally were unable to compete with the larger schools. The public tournament was divided once again in 2018 to include Public C.  In the 2021–2022 season the Public C tournament would pivot again to comprise the growing number of cooperative teams in the state. The initial Public C season would have forty-three co-op and tri-op teams competing for the state crown.

To qualify for the State Tournament, teams must have played a minimum of 10 games and compiled a record of .500 or better record by a date set by the NJSIAA, usually around February 15.  Teams within four games of .500 may petition for an at-large selection to the Tournament.  The NJSIAA may select a maximum of 3 public and 2 private teams for an at-large birth. All members of the Gordon Conference earn automatic entry to the Private Tournament.

In recent years, Delbarton and Randolph have been the dominant private and public hockey programs in the state.  Delbarton has appeared in 13 of the last 19 Private School Championships, winning 8 of the last 12; while Randolph has appeared in 11 of the last 15 Public A Championships (8 of the last 9), winning 7 of the last 11.  Coincidentally, these two schools are located just seven miles apart in Morris County.

State Championship History 
 State Championship Finals 

 1976-Brick 3, Chatham Township 2 (OT)
 1977-Brick 3, Livingston 2
 1978-West Essex 6, Livingston 3
 1979-Brick 2, Seton Hall Prep 1
 1980-Livingston 1, Brick 0 (OT)
 1981-Montclair 6, Brick 5
 1982-Livingston 4, Montclair 2
 1983-CBA 3, Seton Hall Prep 0
 1984-St. Joseph (Montvale) 7, Brick 6
 1985-St. Joseph (Montvale) 4, Brick 2
 1986-Brick 2, Delbarton 1
 1987-Montclair 4, Delbarton 2
 1988-Montclair 2, St. Joseph (Montvale) 1
 1989-Delbarton, St. Joseph (Montvale) - Game Cancelled/Co-Champions See Frozen Flashback
 1990-Brick 2, Montclair 1
 1991-ST. JOSEPH (Montvale) 3, Delbarton 2 (OT)
 1992-Delbarton 3, St. Joseph (Montvale) 2 (OT)
 1993-Toms River North 6, Delbarton 2
 1994-CBA 6, Don Bosco Prep 1
 1995-CBA 4, Montclair 1
 1996-CBA 5, Brick 0
 1997-Brick 4, Seton Hall Prep 0
 1998-Seton Hall Prep 3, Brick 2
 1999-Seton Hall Prep 3, Brick 1
 2000-Hudson Catholic 4, Bayonne 2
 2001-Bergen Catholic 8, Clifton 1
 2002-Delbarton 1, Brick 0
 2003-Bergen Catholic 6, Randolph 4
 2004-Seton Hall Prep 8, West Essex 0

Public Finals
 1995-Montclair 2, Chatham 1 (OT)
 1996-Brick Township 5, Chatham 4
 1997-Brick Township 2, Brick Memorial 1 (OT)
 1998-Brick Township 2, Montclair 1
 1999-Brick Township 5, Randolph 1
 2000-Bayonne 6, Summit 3
 2001-Clifton 2, Bayonne 1
 2002-Brick Township 5, Randolph 1
 2003-Randolph 7, Brick Memorial 0
 2004-West Essex 0, Ridge 1
 2005-Morris Knolls 4, Randolph 1
 2006-Randolph 2, Montgomery 1 (OT)
 2007-Randolph 5, Bridgewater-Raritan 4 (OT)
Public A
 2008-Ridge 5, Watchung Hills 0
 2009-Randolph 1, Ridge 0
 2010-Toms River South 2, Randolph 1
 2011-Randolph 1, Montgomery 0
 2012-Randolph 3, Morristown 1
 2013-Randolph 4, Bridgewater-Raritan 1
 2014-Morris Knolls 3, Bridgewater-Raritan 0
 2015-Randolph 2, Howell 1
 2016-Morristown 2, Randolph 0
 2017-Ridge 2, Watchung Hills 1
 2018-Hunterdon Central 5, Woodbridge Twp. 1
 2019-Morris Knolls-Hills 6, Hillsborough 1
 2020-Morris Knolls 3, Montclair 2
 2021-Covid-19 Tournament Cancelled
 2022-Ridge 6, Livingston 1

Public B
 2008-Kinnelon 5, Jefferson 1
 2009-Ramsey 2, Kinnelon 0
 2010-West Essex 3, Hopewell Valley 0
 2011-Chatham 7, Middletown South 3
 2012-Summit 2, Tenafly 1
 2013-Chatham 3, Morristown 0
 2014-Morristown 1, Ramsey 0
 2015-Middletown North 5, Ramsey 4
 2016-Ramsey 5, Glen Rock 1
 2017-Glen Rock 8, Wall Twp. 1
 2018-Northern Highlands 1, Randolph 0
 2019-Ridge High School 4, Randolph 1
 2020-Randolph 3, Ridge 2
 2021-Covid-19 Tournament Cancelled
 2022-Northern Highlands 3, Middletown North 1

Public C
 2018-Summit 3, Chatham 0
 2019-Summit 6, Chatham 2
 2020-Summit 5,  Ramsey 2
 2021-Covid-19 Tournament Cancelled
 2022-Governor Livingston 2, Morris Knolls 0

Private Finals
 1995-CBA 5, Delbarton 0
 1996-CBA 4, Seton Hall Prep 3
 1997-Seton Hall Prep 4, Delbarton 2
 1998-Seton Hall Prep 3, Delbarton 1
 1999-Seton Hall Prep 1, Delbarton 0 (OT)
 2000-Hudson Catholic 2, Seton Hall Prep 1
 2001-Bergen Catholic 3, Christian Brothers 2
 2002-Delbarton 2, Seton Hall Prep 1
 2003-Bergen Catholic 2, Seton Hall Prep 1
 2004-Seton Hall Prep 3, St. Peter's Prep 1
 2005-CBA 2, Delbarton 1 (OT)
 2006-Delbarton 3, Seton Hall Prep 1
 2007-St. Augustine Prep 3, St. Peter's Prep 1
 2008-Delbarton 5, St. Augustine Prep 1
 2009-Delbarton 7, Christian Brothers 0
 2010-Delbarton 7, Gloucester Catholic 2
 2011-Delbarton 3, St. Augustine Prep 2 (OT) 
 2012-Delbarton 3, Christian Brothers 2
 2013-Delbarton 4, Don Bosco 0
 2014-Christian Brothers 4, Morristown-Beard 4 (Co-Champions) 
 2015-Christian Brothers 4, Delbarton 3 (OT) 
 2016-Delbarton 3, Christian Brothers 1
 2017-Delbarton 2, Don Bosco 1
 2018-Delbarton 4, Don Bosco 2
 2019-Don Bosco Prep 3, Delbarton 1
 2020-Christian Brothers 4, Don Bosco Prep 1
 2021-Covid-19 Tournament Cancelled
 2022-Christian Brothers 3, Delbarton 0

Career Scoring Leaders

Scoring Champions

References

External links
New Jersey High School Hockey
New Jersey Scholastic Hockey Online
New Jersey High School Ice Hockey Hall of Fame
New Jersey Boys Ice Hockey

High school ice hockey in the United States
Hoc
H